Aneilema umbrosum (yungas, rain, chiquitano) is a species of plant in the family Commelinaceae.

References

 (Vahl) Kunth, Enum. Pl. 4: 71. 1843.
 Encyclopedia of Life entry
 Prota4u entry
 eFloras Bolivia checklist entry
 West African Plants entry

umbrosum